The Satellite Catalog Number (SATCAT, also known as NORAD (North American Aerospace Defense) Catalog Number, NORAD ID, USSPACECOM object number or simply catalog number, among similar variants) is a sequential nine-digit number assigned by the United States Space Command (USSPACECOM) in the order of launch or discovery to all artificial objects in the orbits of Earth and those that left Earth's orbit. The first catalogued object, catalog number 1, is the Sputnik 1 launch vehicle, with the Sputnik 1 satellite having been assigned catalog number 2.

Objects that fail to orbit or orbit for a short time are not catalogued. , the catalog listed 54,200 objects, including 14,102 satellites that had been launched into orbit since 1957 of which 7,043 were still active. 24,146 of the objects were well tracked while 1,850 were lost. In addition USSPACECOM was also tracking 20,900 analyst objects. Analyst objects are variably tracked and in constant flux, so their catalog and element set data are not published. ESA estimated there were about 36,500 pieces of orbiting debris that are large enough for USSPACECOM to track.

Permanently catalogued objects are assigned a number from 1 to 69,999 or above 99,999. Space-Track is expected to start publishing objects greater than 99,999 in 2020 starting with debris discovered by Space Fence.

Space Command shares the catalog via space-track.org, which is maintained by the 18th Space Defense Squadron (18 SDS).

History 
Initially, the catalog was maintained by NORAD. From 1985 onwards, USSPACECOM was tasked to detect, track, identify, and maintain a catalog of all human-made objects in Earth orbit. In 2002, USSPACECOM was disestablished and merged with the United States Strategic Command (USSTRATCOM). However, USSPACECOM was reestablished in 2019.

Before 2020, the catalog number was limited to five digits due to the TLE format limitation. In 2020, Space-Track started to provide data in CCSDS OMM (Orbit Mean-Elements Message) format, which increased the maximum catalog number to 999,999,999.

See also 
 International Designator, also known as a COSPAR ID
 Space debris
 Two-line element set (TLE)
 United States Space Surveillance Network

References

External links 
 The catalog: Space-Track.org
 CelesTrak Satellite Catalog (a partial copy of Space-Track.org catalog)

Identifiers
Satellites
United States Strategic Command